USS LST-30 was a United States Navy  used exclusively in the Europe-Africa-Middle East Theater during World War II. Like many of her class, she was not named and is properly referred to by her hull designation.

Construction
LST-30 was laid down on 12 January 1943, at Pittsburgh, Pennsylvania, by the Dravo Corporation; launched on 3 May 1943; sponsored by Mrs. C. B. Jansen; and commissioned on 10 July 1943.

Service history
Records indicate LST-30 traveled from Halifax, Nova Scotia, in  Convoy SC 144 on 11 October 1943, arriving in Liverpool, England, on 27 October 1943.

She participated in the Normandy invasion, June 1944.

She departed Liverpool, on 11 May 1945, with Convoy ONS 50 arriving in Halifax, on 29 May 1945.

Postwar career
LST-30 was decommissioned on 6 March 1946, and was struck from the Navy list on 8 May 1946. On 2 April 1946, she was sold to the W. Horace Williams Company, of New Orleans, Louisiana.

Awards
LST-30 earned one battle star for her World War II service.

References

Bibliography

External links

 

LST-1-class tank landing ships of the United States Navy
World War II amphibious warfare vessels of the United States
Ships built in Pittsburgh
1943 ships
Ships built by Dravo Corporation